Jair Alberto Díaz Vázquez (born 21 August 1998) is a Mexican professional footballer who plays as a left-back for Liga MX club Tijuana.

Career statistics

Club

Honours
Tigres UANL
Liga MX: Apertura 2017, Clausura 2019
Campeón de Campeones: 2017

References

External links
 
 
 

Living people
1998 births
Ascenso MX players
Association football defenders
Atlético San Luis footballers
Liga MX players
Tigres UANL footballers
Venados F.C. players
Footballers from San Luis Potosí
People from San Luis Potosí City
Mexican footballers